Shyam Mitra (8 November 1936 – 27 June 2019) was an Indian cricketer. He played 59 first-class matches for Bengal between 1958 and 1972.

See also
List of Bengal cricketers

References

1936 births
2019 deaths
Indian cricketers
Bengal cricketers
Cricketers from Kolkata